West China College of Stomatology of the West China Medical Center of Sichuan University has a significant role in the development of modern stomatology, and was the earliest hospital of stomatology in China. A dental clinic called Ren Ji Dental Clinic was founded in 1907, and then expanded to the first dental hospital in China in 1912. In 1917 the medical faculty of West China Union University (WCUU) established a department of dentistry and in 1921 the status was raised to the college of dentistry of WCUU. In 1928 the college of Medicine and dentistry formed the joint college of medicine and dentistry of WCUU. It was renamed as Hospital of Stomatology, Sichuan Medical College in 1953. In 1985, it was granted a name as the College of Stomatology, Sichuan University School of Medicine (aka West China University of Medical Sciences) and was changed into West China College of Stomatology, West China Medical Center of Sichuan University in 2000.

History

West China College of Stomatology, known as the birthplace of China's modern dental science education, was started from Ren-Ji Dental Clinic founded in 1907. The clinic, in 1912, grew into the nation's first dental hospital to serve the local community's needs for dental services. In 1917, the hospital became the Department of Dentistry under West China Union University and soon evolved into the College of Dentistry. In 1928, the College of Stomatology was officially founded. Since then, the College has experienced several title changes: in 1951, as Stomatological Hospital of West China University; in 1953, as Faculty of Stomatology, Sichuan Medical College; in 1985, as College of Stomatology, West China University of Medical Sciences; in 2001, as West China College of Stomatology, West China Medical Center of Sichuan University after merging with Sichuan University.

Personnel

For the past 100 years, West China College of Stomatology has enjoyed the reputation as the Mecca of China's higher education in dental sciences. With the notion of “excellent, dedicative, skilled and competitive”, the College nurtures not only the nation's top educators and leading scholars in dental sciences, but also the backbones who chosen to preside over many of the nation's Colleges of Stomatology.
West China College of Stomatology employs the integration model of teaching, clinical care, and research. This College has faculty and staff of 417. Among them, there are 128 senior faculty members, 38 mentors for Ph.D., 57 mentors for M.S. West China College of Stomatology has 5 instruction departments embedding with 24 research sub-units that cover the fields of basic science of Stomatology, oral medicine, oral and maxillofacial surgery, prosthodontics, and orthodontics. Accredited doctoral degree programs are offered in Clinical Science of Stomatology and Basic Science of Stomatology which have been included into National Quality Courses. The college offers 5-year bachelor's degree programs, 7-year master's degree programs, and 8-year doctoral degree programs.

Peter Hessler wrote that the students of that school were "The ultimate campus élite, the Brahmins of Sichuan University" and that students in other departments "resented" them.

State Key Laboratory of Oral Diseases

Medical and Dental Research Department of West China Union University, the former institute of The State Key Laboratory of Oral Diseases, was established in 1936. It was expanded to Stomatological Research Department in 1949; Research Institute of Stomatology in 1958; Central Laboratory of Stomatology in 1983. Then in 1989, it was upgraded to Key Laboratory of Oral Biomedical Engineering of the Ministry of Health. The lab was appointed by National Ministry of Education as Key Laboratory of Oral Biomedical Engineering in 2002 and in The State Key Laboratory of Oral Diseases which is the unique state-level laboratory in the field of stomatology. The State Key Laboratory of Oral Diseases is hosted in a 7,200 m2 facility equipped with advanced experiment instruments. Many research projects, such as the National 973 Project, National 863 Project as well as other major scientific and technological projects of the nation, Sichuan Province and National Ministry of Public Health have been conducted here.

International Journal of Oral Science

The International Journal of Oral Science, which has been listed into database of Science Citation Index Expanded (SCIE) and PubMed (MEDLINE), was edited and published in English by the college in 2008, with the government's approval as the nation's first English journal on dental sciences in China. Awards and honorable titles are bestowed upon its faculty members by national and provincial institutions because of their achievements. Just to name a few: 3 National Doctoral Theses, one faculty member as one of chief scientists for our nation's 973 Project, 2 as Eminent Professor with Thousand Talent Project; one as the nation's Eminent Professor, 2 as Eminent Professor with National Changjiang project, 2 as award-winners of National Outstanding Youth Foundation, 2 professors as the members of Discipline Review Group of State Department, 2 professors as National Talents by Ministry of Human Resource Administration, 16 as New Millennium Talents by National Ministry of Education, 1 as Eminent Professor by the National Ministry of Science and Technology, 2 as Specialist by National Ministry of Public Health.

Affiliated organizations

The West China Hospital of Stomatology has long been ranked as one of the nation's top hospitals. The hospital functions as the clinical treatment center for oral diseases and maxillofacial surgery in the Western-China area because of its abilities to provide full range of sophisticated diagnostic and therapeutic treatments. The hospital has a 54,540 square-meter new clinical building which hosts 350 dental units and 260 in-patient beds. The hospital annually treats about 400,000 outpatients (including emergency cases) and admits 4,000 inpatients among whom about 3,500 receive operations. In 2008, the magnitude 8 Wen Chuan earthquake occurred in Sichuan, timely first-aid and rescue service has been provided to people who were wounded in the disaster. Those operations of our hospital in the earthquake received nation's and provincial praising.

See also 
 Protestantism in Sichuan

References

External links 
 website of West China College of Stomatology

Dental schools
Sichuan University
Protestantism in Sichuan
Christianity in Chengdu